My Love By My Side is a 2011 South Korean television series starring Lee So-yeon, Lee Jae-yoon and On Joo-wan. It aired on SBS from May 7 to October 23, 2011 on Saturdays and Sundays at 20:50 for 50 episodes.

Plot
Do Mi-sol is a single mother who gave birth when she was a teenager and raised her son alone after her boyfriend dumped her. Years later, she falls in love with a kind-hearted man.

Cast
Lee So-yeon as Do Mi-sol
Lee Jae-yoon as Lee So-ryong
On Joo-wan as Go Seok-bin
Kim Mi-sook as Bong Sun-ah 
Moon Cheon-shik as Kim Woo-dong 
Kim Mi-kyung as Choi Eun-hee
Kim Myung-gook as Lee Man-soo
Sa Mi-ja as Sarah Jung
Jeon Hye-bin as Jo Yoon-jung
Lee Hwi-hyang as Bae Jung-ja
Kim Il-woo as Go Jin-taek
Moon Ji-in as Go Soo-bin
Choi Jae-sung as Go Jin-gook
Jung Hye-sun as Mrs. Kang
Lee Eui-jung as Lee Joo-ri
Oh Chi-woong as Director Kang 
Park Jung-woo as John Cook 
Ryan as Jason
Kim Tae-joon 
Lee Tae-woo as Bong Young-woong
Yoon Yi-na

Awards and nominations

International broadcast
 It aired in Vietnam from June 6, 2014 on VTV3 under the title Hãy sống bên anh.

References

External links
My Love By My Side official SBS website 

2011 South Korean television series debuts
2011 South Korean television series endings
Seoul Broadcasting System television dramas
Korean-language television shows
South Korean romance television series